Cham Anjir (also Romanized as Cham Anjīr and Chamanjer) is a village in Koregah-e Gharbi Rural District, in the Central District of Khorramabad County, Lorestan Province, Iran. At the 2006 census, its population was 489, in 96 families.

References 

Towns and villages in Khorramabad County